Richard Allen Baldwin (June 10, 1955June 12, 1997) was an American racing driver who competed on the NASCAR circuit. He ran a few races each season between 1983 and 1985, running his self-owned Dodge Mirada and Chrysler Imperial.

On June 14, 1986, Baldwin was substituting for the injured Buddy Arrington at the Miller American 400 at Michigan International Speedway, part of the NASCAR Winston Cup Series. During qualifying, Baldwin spun and hit the wall, driver's side first, between turns one and two. The protective window netting may have failed to prevent his head from striking the wall during the impact, resulting in massive head injuries.

In January 1992, a law suit was
 filed by Baldwin's wife Deborah, claiming the window net had allowed her husband's head to strike the wall, was decided in favor of NASCAR, which was cleared of negligence by a 12-person state district court jury.

After eleven years in a coma, Baldwin died two days after his 42nd birthday in 1997. The fatality was the first driver death in the history of Michigan International Speedway. Baldwin was survived by his wife, two daughters, Jennifer and Tiffany, and his mother and father.

References

External links

Motorsport Memorial
Daytona Beach Sunday News-Journal article on Baldwin and his family's situation published in February 1988
The News-Journal article on Baldwin and his family's situation published in February 1989
Daytona Beach Sunday News-Journal article on Baldwin and his family's situation published in February 1993

1955 births
1997 deaths
Racing drivers from Texas
NASCAR drivers
People with severe brain damage
Racing drivers who died while racing
Sports deaths in Michigan
Sportspeople from Corpus Christi, Texas